The North American Poker Tour (NAPT) was a series of international poker tournaments held in North America.  The NAPT included an associated television series broadcasting the final table of some of the tournaments.

The NAPT was started in 2010 by PokerStars, then the largest online poker cardroom in the world.  The televised series aired on ESPN2 in the United States.

Players were able to enter the NAPT events by paying the entry fee or by playing online poker freeroll satellites on the PokerStars.net domain.

Season 1 consisted of 7 events played in 2010.  Season 2 saw 3 events played in early 2011 before competition was suspended.

On April 15, 2011, along with similar competitors' sites, Pokerstars.com was seized and shut down by U.S. Attorney's Office for the Southern District of New York, which alleged it was in violation of federal bank fraud and money laundering laws.  The company subsequently stopped allowing players from the United States to play real money games and temporarily moved the main company website to Pokerstars.eu.

As of February 13, 2012, the NAPT website, and information on remaining events for Season 2, has not been updated since the April 15, 2011 seizure.  The last NAPT event had concluded just 2 days earlier, on April 13, 2011, when Vanessa Selbst defended her Season 1 NAPT Mohegan Sun victory by winning the Season 2 NAPT Mohegan Sun event.

As of March 3, 2012 (possibly earlier), the NAPT website no longer shows the North American series—redirecting instead to information regarding the Latin American Poker Tour.

Results
 North American Poker Tour season 1
 North American Poker Tour season 2 (as suspended April 15, 2011)

References

External links
Official site

 
Poker tournaments
ESPN2 original programming
Poker in North America